Domville may refer to:

Domville, Ontario
Domville, Queensland, a locality in the Toowoomba Region, Australia
Domville baronets
Guy Domville, an 1895 play by Henry James

People 
James Domville (1842–1921)
William Domville (1609–1689)

See also 
Domvile